Kemal Osmanković (born 4 March 1997) is a Bosnian professional footballer who plays as a centre-back for Sloboda Tuzla.

Honours
Željezničar
Bosnian Cup: 2017–18

References

External links
Kemal Osmanković at Sofascore

1997 births
Living people
Footballers from Sarajevo
Bosnia and Herzegovina footballers
Association football central defenders
Bosnia and Herzegovina expatriate footballers
Expatriate footballers in Croatia
Bosnia and Herzegovina expatriate sportspeople in Croatia
Premier League of Bosnia and Herzegovina players
Croatian Football League players
FK Željezničar Sarajevo players
NK Lokomotiva Zagreb players
FK Sloboda Tuzla players
Bosnia and Herzegovina youth international footballers 
Bosnia and Herzegovina under-21 international footballers